Regarding Africa-Europe relations  see:
 African military systems (1800–1900)
 Colonisation of Africa
 Scramble for Africa
 Decolonisation of Africa
 Economic history of Africa
 British diaspora in Africa
 British West Africa
 East Africa Protectorate
 History of Egypt under the British
 Historiography of the British Empire
 South Africa–United Kingdom relations

 Foreign relations of the African Union
 Italian Empire
 Organisation internationale de la Francophonie for France
 African French, on language
 French colonial empire
 Belgian colonial empire
 Romance-speaking African countries
 Portuguese Africa (disambiguation)
 Soviet Union-Africa relations
 Yugoslavia and the Organisation of African Unity

18th century in Africa
19th century in Africa
20th century in Africa
British colonisation in Africa
European colonisation in Africa